Knoxville Township is an inactive township in Ray County, in the U.S. state of Missouri. It is part of the Kansas City metropolitan area.

History
Knoxville Township was founded in 1841, taking its name from the town of Knoxville.

References

Townships in Ray County, Missouri
Townships in Missouri